The W. L. Wood House is a historic house at 709 North Morrill Street in Morrilton, Arkansas.  It is a -story wood-frame structure, with a hip roof, weatherboard exterior, and foundation of stone and brick.  It has the asymmetrical massing typical of the Queen Anne period, with a three-story turret at the left corner, and a porch that wraps across the front and around the base of the tower.  The porch is supported by round columns and has a turned balustrade and a low gable over the main steps.  A large gable that projects from the main roof has a rounded-corner balcony at its center.  The interior has richly detailed woodwork in the Eastlake style.  The house was purchased as a prefab from Sears & Roebuck, shipped by rail to Morrilton, moved to its current location by mule drawn wagon and built in 1905–06 for William L. Wood, a prominent local businessman.

The house was listed on the National Register of Historic Places in 2002.

See also
National Register of Historic Places listings in Conway County, Arkansas

References

Houses on the National Register of Historic Places in Arkansas
Queen Anne architecture in Arkansas
Houses completed in 1905
Houses in Conway County, Arkansas
Buildings and structures in Morrilton, Arkansas
1905 establishments in Arkansas